NGC 6535 is a globular cluster of stars located at a distance of 22,200 light years from Earth in the equatorial constellation of Serpens, and is listed in the New General Catalogue. Its discovery is usually attributed to astronomer John Russell Hind in 1852, however Wolfgang Steinicke has uncovered evidence that William Herschel's first discovery was actually NGC 6535, which he observed on 24th August 1780.

The cluster is suspected to harbour an intermediate-mass black hole in its center and, unusually for a low-mass globular cluster, has had multiple generations of stars. Rather small and sparse for a globular cluster, this cluster contains no known RR Lyrae variables, which is unusual for a globular cluster.

References

External links
 

Serpens (constellation)
Globular clusters
Astronomical objects discovered in 1852
6535